Amadis Jamyn (1540 – 1593) was a French poet, a friend of Ronsard.

Born in Chaource near Troyes, he is known mostly for his love poems, but was also a good Greek scholar (he translated Homer).

Main works 
Oeuvre Poétiques:
Dialogue 
Elégie 
Épitaphe 
Stances de l'impossible

References

External links
Jamyn's Poems in French

French poets
French male poets
1540 births
1593 deaths